Novoselë (also: Piskal-Novoselë) is a village and a former municipality in the Korçë County, southeastern Albania. At the 2015 local government reform it became a subdivision of the municipality Kolonjë. The population at the 2011 census was 355. The municipal unit consists of the villages Novoselë, Mesiçkë, Kagjinas, Zharkan, Piskal, Vitisht, Shijan, Kaduç, Ndërrmarr and Mbreshtan.

Notable people
Sejfi Vllamasi, politician

References

Former municipalities in Korçë County
Administrative units of Kolonjë, Korçë
Villages in Korçë County